The Wisconsin & Michigan Railway (W&M) was incorporated October 26, 1893, under the general laws of Wisconsin for the purpose of constructing, maintaining, and operating a railroad as described in its articles of incorporation.

Incorporation to 1900

Early history
The W&M railway acquired six railroad corporations by purchasing their property, rights, and franchises. The railway also purchased the railroad property of the Peshtigo Lumber Company of Peshtigo, Wi. The W&M Railway was conceived in 1893 by John N Faithorn, a railroad tycoon from Chicago, Il. His idea was to build a railroad connect the iron-rich Upper Peninsula of Michigan, with the steel mills in cities using both railroads and lake ferries.

First Track Is Laid - 1894
This railroad began building from the Soo Line railroad at Faithorn Junction in Wisconsin south about five miles. Faithorn was named for J. Nathan Faithorn, an official of the railroad. The initial ending point was the Ingalls, White Rapids & Northern Logging railway aka IWR&N. This location would later become known as Bagley_Junction.

A five-mile section of the IWR&N was standard gauged from Ingalls, Michigan to the Menominee River, the state line. A bridge was built in 1894 to cross the Menominee River at Koss, Michigan to Wagner, Wisconsin.

On December 2, 1894, the Wisconsin & Michigan Railway began passenger service from Peshtigo, Wi to Faithorn Junction  and two days later followed with freight trains.

Line South To Peshtigo - 1884
The railway had been unable to get dock frontage in Marinette or Menominee for its planned ferry service so the W&M instead purchased a line south to the harbor at Petshigo, Wi.

Ferry Service Begins - 1895
Begun in 1895 by a newly formed subsidiary of the Wisconsin and Michigan Railway: Lake Michigan Car Ferry Transportation Company (LMCFT Co.). Begun with a pair of wooden barges from the Peshtigo Harbor the service was run from there to South Chicago.  Each barge was capable of holding 28 cars on deck, but no propulsion engine.

With a newly acquired tug the LMCFT Co. inaugurated service on August 31, 1895, delivering 26 cars of coal and merchandise from South Chicago to the Wisconsin and Michigan harbor slip in Peshtigo.

New Locomotives Arrive & Lumber Business Expands 1895-97
In 1895 the W&M received a new Baldwin 10 wheeler and gave it number 8. It was too heavy for their light rail and was returned to Baldwin. They bought a smaller 10 wheeler, but it too performed poorly on the track north of Fischer. They kept the new locomotive and improved that section of track.

Ferry Traffic Increases - 1897

Lumber Subsidiary Sold - 1889

Northward Extension Begins & Misfortunes Beset Railway - 1898
From the cited references - "Wisconsin and Michigan Railway will Build Thirty Miles of New Road and Iron Mountain will be its Terminus. " and "Railroad scene near Quinnesec, Mich". Behind the train is C&NW RR line from Quinnesec to Iron Mountain, Mi.

Walsh Orders Improvements - 1900
Chicago capitalist John R. Walsh, owner of the Chicago Southern railroads, owner of the Chicago Terminal Transfer, founder of the Chicago National Bank and owner of the Southern Indiana purchased a controlling interest in the Railway in October 1900. Walsh ordered a rapid series of improvements. The W&M completely rebuilt the track between Faithorn Junction and Koss, improved the entire main line with new ballast, upgraded to 75 pound rail and constructed new stations to convert the ailing W&M into a major trunk line.

1901 - 1910

Two Branch Lines Added, New Locomotives And Cars & Western Division Added - 1901-04

Miscauno Inn Opens & Ore Traffic Begins, Extension To Lake Superior & Walsh's Empire Collapses - 1905

Photograph of a crew employed by John Marsch to extend the Wisconsin & Michigan Railway from Faithorn Junction to Norway in 1903.

Improvements Initiated & Railway Reaches Maximum Size - 1906-08
The railroad reached its maximum size in 1908, with a few logging operations on several branch lines.

Stations

Financier Sent To Prison & Railway Service Reduced - 1910
John Walsh was the financier chiefly responsible for the 1900 upgrading and re-equipping the railroad. He began serving a 5 year prison term at Leavenworth for loaning himself millions of dollars from his Chicago National Bank and used it to develop his various railroads.

1911 - 1938

Marsch Buys Entire Railway - 1917
On June 13, 1916, the railway line extended from Peshtigo Harbor, Wisconsin, to Iron Mountain, Michigan, with branch lines extending from Everett, Aragon Junction, and Bergam, Michigan. A total of 114 miles of mainline and 17 miles of yard and sidings.

Shops Move To Menominee & Equipment & Trackage Sold - 1918

Ferry Automobile Traffic Increases - 1919
Congressman Frank D. Scott helped the railroad obtained more favorable freight rates. Businessmen from Chicago and Minneapolis were persuaded by Menominee and Marinette shippers to route their freight via the W&M which increased between the Ann Arbor ferry slip at Menominee and the rest of their railway and onward to the Soo Line as well. Automobiles transported from lower Michigan factories to Minneapolis and the Northwest was a big boost to the railroad. Some traffic from Ohio and Michigan agricultural implements and machinery grew this volume following the Ann Arbor - W&M - Soo Line route. A heavy traffic in automobiles, covered with tarps were shipped on flat cars or in boxcars. A record load was hauled On June 7, 1920 - 90 new Dort automobiles on 31 flat cars to the Soo Line. Lumber for Ford Motor company was also hauled to be forwarded by the Ann Arbor Railroad ferrys.

The railroad opened business offices in Pittsburgh, Dayton, Detroit, Minneapolis and Seattle. They began using the motto "Short Route To and From The Northwest" in advertising.

More New Locomotives Arrive - 1920
The Commercial Atlas of America; Rand McNally Black and White Mileage Map, Michigan 1924 edition has an excellent depiction of the railroad's mainline.

Depression Doomed Railway - 1929
The  Wisconsin & Michigan Railway was unable to find a buyer for the line, applied for abandonment on April 10, 1937.

On January 20, 1938, the ICC authorized the  Wisconsin & Michigan Railway abandonment. The Chicago & North Western Railroad bought the Menominee W. & M. Railroad property in early 1939.

Further reading

Bridgehunter.com | Wisconsin & Michigan Railroad
Wisconsin & Michigan Railway map
WikiProject Trains/ICC valuations/Wisconsin and Michigan Railway

 History of a small regional railroad in the area straddling states of Wisconsin & Michigan. Black and white photos throughout. Glossy paper.

 History of a small regional railroad in the area straddling states of Wisconsin & Michigan. Black and white photos throughout. Glossy paper.

References

 
 
 
 
Railway companies disestablished in 1938